Stomatodexia is a genus of parasitic flies in the family Tachinidae. There are about six described species in Stomatodexia.

Species
These six species belong to the genus Stomatodexia:
 Stomatodexia cothurnata (Wiedemann, 1830)
 Stomatodexia longitarsis (Macquart, 1843)
 Stomatodexia obscura (Walker, 1853)
 Stomatodexia quadrimaculata (Walker, 1853)
 Stomatodexia similigena Wulp, 1891
 Stomatodexia tinctisquamae Curran, 1926

References

Further reading

 
 
 
 

Tachinidae
Articles created by Qbugbot